The rue Saint-Séverin is a sometimes boisterous street running parallel to the river in the north of Paris' Latin Quarter. Lined with restaurants and souvenir shops, much of its commerce is dedicated to tourism.

Name Origin
One of Paris' oldest churches, the Église Saint-Séverin, lies midway along this street's length.

History
The rue Saint-Séverin is one of Paris' oldest streets, as it dates from its quarter's creation in the early 13th century.

Former Names: Between the rue de la Harpe and the rue Saint-Jacques, this street was called the "rue Colin Pochet" in the 16th century.

Constructions of note

Odd Numbers
7, 9, 11 - Buildings dating from the 17th century.
13 - Building still having its "name sign" that predated addresses - this one "Le Cygne de la Croix" (a play-on-words of "the sign of the Cross" and "The Swan on the Cross").

Even Numbers
4 - Engraving of streetname on building corner. "St" scratched away.
6 - Alleyway existing (and already barricaded) in 1239.
8 - Door and alleyway dating from the 16th century.
20 - 17th-century "rotisserie" (grill).
22 - 17th century hotel.
24-26 - Street name engraved on building corners; the "St." on both was scratched away after the 1789 revolution.
34 - Building dating from the 17th century. Remarkable doorway, arch engravings, courtyard and stairway (therein).
36 - Building known as l'auberge de "l'Étoile" in 1660.

See also
The Great Cat Massacre

References

 
  Mairie de Paris - "Nomenclature des Voies: rue Saint-Séverin". Retrieved February 17, 2006.

Restaurant districts and streets in France